Anthony Patrick (1927 – 22 April 2010) was an Indian footballer who played for the India national team and represented Hyderabad City Police FC in domestic tournaments.

Playing career
He was selected to play for the national team at the 1954 Asian Games at Manila and also at the 1953 and 1954 editions of the Colombo Cup. In 1954 Colombo Cup, he scored a goal against Burma national football team at Eden Gardens. He also won five Rovers Cup titles while playing for the Rahim managed Hyderabad City Police consecutively from 1950 to 1954. He also represented Hyderabad in Santosh Trophy.

Honours
Hyderabad City Police
Durand Cup: 1950–51, 1954, 1957–58, 1961; runner-up: 1952, 1956–57
Rovers Cup: 1950, 1951, 1952, 1953, 1954, 1957
DCM Trophy: 1959
Sait Nagjee Trophy: 1958

India
Colombo Cup: 1953, 1954

Hyderabad
Santosh Trophy: 1956–57, 1957–58

References 

1927 births
2010 deaths
Indian footballers
India international footballers
Footballers from Hyderabad, India
Association football forwards
Footballers at the 1954 Asian Games
Asian Games competitors for India